The Americas Zone was one of the three zones of the regional Davis Cup competition in 2001.

In the Americas Zone there were four different tiers, called groups, in which teams competed against each other to advance to the upper tier. The top two teams in Group III advanced to the Americas Zone Group II in 2002, whereas the bottom two teams were relegated to the Americas Zone Group IV in 2002.

Participating nations

Draw
 Venue: Cuba
 Date: 14–18 March

Group A

Group B

1st to 4th place play-offs

5th to 8th place play-offs

Final standings

  and  promoted to Group II in 2002.
  and  relegated to Group IV in 2002.

Round robin

Group A

El Salvador vs. Honduras

Puerto Rico vs. Trinidad and Tobago

El Salvador vs. Trinidad and Tobago

Honduras vs. Puerto Rico

El Salvador vs. Puerto Rico

Honduras vs. Trinidad and Tobago

Group B

Bermuda vs. Cuba

Bolivia vs. Jamaica

Bermuda vs. Jamaica

Bolivia vs. Cuba

Bermuda vs. Bolivia

Cuba vs. Jamaica

1st to 4th place play-offs

Semifinals

Trinidad and Tobago vs. Jamaica

Cuba vs. El Salvador

Final

Trinidad and Tobago vs. Cuba

3rd to 4th play-off

Jamaica vs. El Salvador

5th to 8th place play-offs

5th to 8th play-offs

Honduras vs. Bermuda

Bolivia vs. Puerto Rico

5th to 6th play-off

Honduras vs. Puerto Rico

7th to 8th play-off

Bermuda vs. Bolivia

References

External links
Davis Cup official website

Davis Cup Americas Zone
Americas Zone Group III